{{DISPLAYTITLE:C17H19FN2O2}}
The molecular formula C17H19FN2O2 (molar mass: 302.34 g/mol, exact mass: 302.1431 u) may refer to:

 Ralfinamide (NW-1029)
 Safinamide

Molecular formulas